Rhodomyrtus macrocarpa is a species of the botanical family Myrtaceae. It grows into a tree, native to north-east Australia, New Guinea and the Aru Islands, and is also known as wannakai, finger cherry, or Cooktown loquat.

In Australia, botanical sources describe it as occurring naturally from coastal central Queensland to the Wet Tropics, where it extends up to 800m above sea level, and through to Cape York Peninsula. It grows in complex wet rainforests, although it is more common in drier, more seasonal kinds, and in monsoon forests.

It is sometimes cultivated for its ornamental flowers and bright red fruit. However the fruit is poisonous, especially so to children, and has been known to cause permanent blindness.

References

 

Myrtaceae